Sanna Laari ( Markkanen; born 14 April 1990) is a Finnish biathlete. She competed in the 2013/14 and 2014/15 World Cup seasons, and represented Finland at the Biathlon World Championships 2015 in Kontiolahti.

References

External links 
 

1990 births
Living people
Finnish female biathletes